The Elling Woman is a bog body discovered in 1938 west of Silkeborg, Denmark. The Tollund Man was later discovered just c.  away, twelve years after the Elling Woman's discovery. The Elling Woman was mistakenly described as a man in P.V. Glob's book, The Bog People, when it was published in 1965.

Discovery

Later known as the Elling Woman, the body was discovered by a local farmer, Jens Zakariasson, who at first believed that the remains were of a drowned animal. The body was wrapped in a sheepskin cape with a leather cloak tied around her legs. The face of the woman was poorly preserved, and there were no traces of organs inside of the body.

Examination

The Elling Woman is believed to have been hanged, like the Tollund Man. The estimated year of death was dated to approximately 280 BCE in the Nordic Iron Age, also around the time of the Tollund Man; however, it is not possible to confirm whether or not they were both killed at exactly the same time. It also initially might have been impossible to tell the sex of her body, if the hair had not been preserved, although X rays were taken of her pelvis, which proved she was female.

In 1978, the body was reexamined with radiographs, from which the sex was determined to be female and the original age-at-death estimate of 25 years was found to be accurate. This body is often identified by the  braid on her head, which was tied into an elaborate knot. Elling Woman is believed to have been a human sacrifice.

Demineralization, which often occurs with bog bodies, was found to be the initial cause of what was first understood as apparent osteoporosis in the remains.

References

1st-millennium BC births
1st-millennium BC deaths
1938 archaeological discoveries
Archaeological discoveries in Denmark
Bog bodies
Deaths by hanging
Prehistory of Denmark